Sylvie Didone (born 31 August 1979) is a French rhythmic gymnast. She competed in the women's group all-around event at the 1996 Summer Olympics.

References

External links
 

1979 births
Living people
French rhythmic gymnasts
Olympic gymnasts of France
Gymnasts at the 1996 Summer Olympics
People from Vénissieux
Sportspeople from Lyon Metropolis